Flávio Aurélio dos Santos Soares (Espiga) is a Brazilian professional basketball player, who plays in the Novo Basquete Brasil league.

Previous Teams
Vasco da Gama
Report Suzano
Report Mogi
Tijuca Tênis Clube
Corinthians/RS
Jequiá I.C.
Fluminense
Unit/Uberlândia
Minas Tênis Clube

Ciser/Araldite/Univille

Espiga was one of the founding players of the Joinville team, after the team lost its sponsor and was re-created a couple of years later. He is the oldest player on the squad, but is very loved by the local crowd and gets many minutes off the bench. On the first round of the 2010 playoffs, Espiga started on all 3 games, because starting point guard Manteguinha was injured.

NBB Stats

Regular season

|-
| style="text-align:left;"| 
| style="text-align:left;"| Joinville
| 22 || 12 || 27.5 || .692 || .342 || .714 || 2.6 || 3.7 || N/A || 0.0 || 8.6
|-
| style="text-align:left;"| 
| style="text-align:left;"| Joinville
| 24 || 5 || 16.6 || .399 || .305 || .545 || 1.67 || 2.21 || 0.8 || 0.0 || 4.58

Playoffs

|-
| style="text-align:left;"| 
| style="text-align:left;"| Joinville
| 6 || 0 || 28.5 || .643 || .245 || 1.000 || 2.2 || 3.2 || N/A || 0.0 || 9.0
|-
| style="text-align:left;"| 
| style="text-align:left;"| Joinville
| 3 || 3 || 19.3 || .461 || .333 || .750 || 3.33 || 3.33 || 1.0 || 0 || 13.7

References

1972 births
Living people
Basketball players from Rio de Janeiro (city)
Brazilian men's basketball players
Point guards